Adriatic Basketball Association – ABA League, G.P., commonly referred to as the ABA League JTD, is a Croatian company based in Zagreb. It is the general partnership for organizing sports competitions. The company has been running the Adriatic League since the 2015–16 season.

The company runs and operates the three regional-wide men's professional club basketball competitions in South-Eastern Europe, the first-tier ABA League First Division, the second-tier ABA League Second Division, and the ABA League Supercup tournament.

History

Founders and shareholders
The founders, as well as the shareholders between 2015 and 2020, of the company were 12 basketball clubs, as follows KK Budućnost (Montenegro), KK Cedevita (Croatia), KK Cibona (Croatia), KK Crvena zvezda (Serbia), KK Igokea (Bosnia and Herzegovina), KK Krka Telekom Novo Mesto (Slovenia), KK Mega Vizura (Serbia), KK Metalac Valjevo (Serbia), KK MZT Skopje Aerodrom AD Skopje (North Macedonia), KK Olimpija Ljubljana (Slovenia), KK Partizan (Serbia), and KK Zadar (Croatia).

In the late 2020, the shares owned by Cedevita, Metalac, MZT Skopje Aerodrom and Olimpija Ljubljana were transferred to KK Cedevita Olimpija (Slovenia), KK Koper Primorska (Slovenia), KK Mornar Bar (Montenegro), and KK FMP (Serbia).

Current shareholders 
Following is the list of current shareholders, as of November 2020.

  Budućnost
  Cedevita Olimpija
  Cibona
  Crvena zvezda

  FMP
  Igokea
  Koper Primorska
  Krka

  Mega Basket
  Mornar 
  Partizan
  Zadar

Management

Current officeholders 
The following are the current officeholders of the ABA League:
  Đorđije Pavićević, President
  David Gunjević, Vice-president
  Goran Ćakić, Vice-president
  Dubravko Kmetović, Director 
  Milija Vojinović, Sports Director
  Vanja Vujičić, Technical Secretary 
  Srđan Dožai, Commissioner for Delegating Referees 	 
  Saša Maričić, President of Referees Commission

List of officeholders

Presidents 
  Dragan Bokan (2015–16)
  Mladen Veber (2016–17)
  Nebojša Čović (2017–18)
  Igor Dodik (2018–19)
  Domagoj Čavlović (2019–20)
  Đorđe Avramović (2021)
  Đorđije Pavićević (2022–23)

General managers 
  Krešimir Novosel (2015–2019)
  Dubravko Kmetović (2020–present)

Sports directors 
  Žarko Čabarkapa (2015–2019)
  Milija Vojinović (2020–present)

Commissioners for delegating referees  
  Iztok Rems (2015–2020)
  Srđan Dožai (2020–present)

President of referees commission  
  Branko Jovanović (2015–2020)
  Saša Maričić (2020–present)

Secretaries of referees commission  
  Dragan Medan (2015–2020)

Current competitions
 2022–23 ABA League First Division
 2022–23 ABA League Second Division
 2022–23 Junior ABA League

Current title holders

See also 
 Euroleague Basketball
 ULEB
 ABA League Players Union

References

External links
 

Company
Companies based in Zagreb
Companies of Croatia
 
Croatian companies established in 2015